Rui Costa dos Santos (born 18 January 1963) is a Brazilian economist and politician who has served as the Chief of Staff of the Presidency since 1 January 2023. He previously served as governor of Bahia from January 2015 to December 2022. He is affiliated with the Workers' Party (PT).

In January 2007, invited by the Governor Jaques Wagner, Rui Costa took over the Secretariat of Institutional Relations (Serin), where he stayed until 2010. In Serin, Rui developed a new model of integration between the executive and legislative state with federal entities and social movements. The initiative was enhanced with the launch of the Institutional Relationship System (SRI), designed to speed up the progress of claims and standardize care.

In 2010 he was elected federal deputy for the PT, again with the highest number of votes of the PT bench.

Rui Costa was chosen as the PT candidate for the State of Bahia in elections in 2014, and elected in the 1st round with 54.53% of the votes, against 37.39% of his main opponent, Paulo Souto. In 2018, he was reelected with over 75% of the votes in the first round, easily defeating Zé Ronaldo.

Rui Costa is considered a moderate among his party. As governor, he privatized the state owned supermarket, approved a pension reform, implemented public–private partnerships for education and health and supported electoral alliances with the PSDB and Democrats, center right historical rivals of PT, in the 2022 presidential election in order to defeat Bolsonaro. He is being considered as the PT presidential nominee in 2022.

Criticism
Following the 2015 killing of 12 men, including four teenagers, by state police, Amnesty International published a Huffington Post article on its website, reporting that official figures from the Annual Report of Public Security, reveal that, each day, "at least six people are killed by police officers in Brazil" and that the true number is likely higher, as "most states across the country prefer to keep these alarming figures under wraps." Costa was widely criticized for his public response, including a false narrative of events and declaring the police as "heroes".

Al-Jazeera also reported the killings and that the largest Black population in Brazil, resides in Costa's home, the Bahia state capitol, Salvador da Bahia, and that "80 percent of those killed by police in Brazil are young, black and poor."

References

|-

|-

|-

|-

|-

Living people
1963 births
Governors of Roraima
Members of the Chamber of Deputies (Brazil) from Bahia
Workers' Party (Brazil) politicians
Brazilian economists
People from Salvador, Bahia
Chiefs of Staff of Brazil